Orlando Williams Wight (February 19, 1824 – October 19, 1888) was an American physician and translator.

Biography
Wight was born in Centreville, N. Y. He was educated at the Rochestern College Institute, was ordained as a Universalist clergyman and accepted a call to Newark, New Jersey (1850). Three years later he left the church to engage in literary work. In 1865 he graduated in medicine at the Long Island College Hospital; in 1874 was appointed State geologist and Surgeon General of Wisconsin, and afterward served as health commissioner of Milwaukee (1878–1880) and of Detroit.

Selected publications
History of Modern Philosophy (translated with F. W. Ricord from the French of Victor Cousin, 1852)
Life of Abélard and Héloise (1853 and 1861)
Standard French Classics (fourteen volumes, 1858–1860)
Pascal's Thoughts (1859)
The Household Library (18 volumes, 1859 et seq.)
six volumes of translations from Balzac (1860)
Henry Martin's History of France (with Mary L. Booth, 1863)
A Winding Journey Around the World (1888)

References

Physicians from Michigan
SUNY Downstate Medical Center alumni
American Christian clergy
19th-century Christian clergy
Clergy from Newark, New Jersey
People from Allegany County, New York
1824 births
1888 deaths
19th-century American translators
American healthcare managers
19th-century American clergy